Home Is the Hunter is a Star Trek: The Original Series novel written by Dana Kramer-Rolls.

Plot
Captain Kirk, commanding the USS Enterprise, gets into a fight with a Klingon ship concerning arguments over a primitive planet and its inhabitants. A mysterious, powerful entity named 'Weyland' stops the fight and decides to punish three of the Enterprise crew with their own history.

Hikaru Sulu is sent to feudal Japan during a bloody power struggle. Scotty is sent to Scotland in the eighteenth century on the eve of revolt. Chekov is sent to his beloved homeland of Russia during World War 2.

All three eventually make it back home to their right time and place, Sulu even managing to leave a literal mark on history with a carved message on a durable rock.

References

External links 

Novels based on Star Trek: The Original Series
1990 American novels
American science fiction novels
Cultural depictions of Joseph Stalin
Cultural depictions of Tokugawa Ieyasu